Thomas Schoorel (born 8 April 1989) is a retired Dutch tennis player.

Schoorel has a career high ATP singles ranking of World No. 94, achieved on 4 July 2011. He also has a career high ATP doubles ranking of World No. 299, achieved on 30 August 2010.

Career

Schoorel made his ATP Tour singles main draw debut at the 2010 If Stockholm Open on hard courts in Sweden. Having to earn his spot in the main draw by advancing through three qualifying rounds, Thomas proceeded to beat Patrik Rosenholm 6–4, 6–4, followed by Erling Tveit 6–7(2–7), 6–4, 6–4 and finally Marcel Granollers 6–4, 7–5 to secure a main draw birth. In the first round, he would go on to be defeated by German Benjamin Becker in straight sets 3–6, 0–6. He made his ATP Tour doubles main draw debut at the 2008 Dutch Open in Amersfoort, Netherlands when he was gifted entry as an alternate pair alongside compatriot Huib Troost. They were defeated in the first round by Russian duo Teimuraz Gabashvili and Denis Matsukevitch in straight sets 2–6, 4–6.

Schoorel won the Dutch Tennis Masters in December 2010, beating Thiemo de Bakker in the final. His two ATP Challenger singles titles both came in April 2011 back to back on clay courts in Italy. First he defeated Martin Klizan of Slovakia 7–5, 1–6, 6–3 to capture the Rome Challenger title,  and then he defeated Filippo Volandri of Italy 6–2, 7–6(7–4) to claim the Naples Challenger championship.

Schoorel has reached 19 career singles finals, with a record of 10 wins and 9 losses which includes a 2–4 record in ATP Challenger Tour finals. Additionally, he has reached 8 career doubles finals with a record of 4 wins and 4 losses which includes a 1–1 record in ATP Challenger tour finals. He represents his native country Netherlands when competing in the Davis Cup, where he has a record of 2 wins and 1 loss in singles play.

Schoorel is also student at the Johan Cruyff College.

ATP Challenger and ITF Futures finals

Singles: 19 (10–9)

Doubles: 8 (4–4)

References

External links

1989 births
Living people
Dutch male tennis players
Tennis players from Amsterdam
21st-century Dutch people